The following is a list of neighborhoods in North Bergen, New Jersey.

Bergenline runs to Nungesser's at the Fairview border near North Hudson Park.
Bigleys/Three Ditches-a wetlands area between the Northeast Corridor and Secaucus Road.
Racetrack Section-between Bergenline and Kennedy Boulevard on the palisades plateau 
Bergenwood, on the steep slopes of the west side of the Palisades
New Durham site of colonial American Three Pigeons near the Bergen Turnpike and Tonnelle Avenue
Meadowview, behind the Municipal Building between the many cemeteries:
Flower Hill Cemetery, Hoboken Cemetery, and Weehawken Cemetery
Bulls Ferry on the Hudson Waterfront, site of Roc Harbor, Palisades Medical Center and Hudson River Waterfront Walkway
Babbitt from the rail station near North Bergen Yard in Meadowlands
Woodcliff on the Hudson Palisades around North Hudson Park 
Transfer Station near the single point border Union City and Jersey City near Paterson Plank Road, Kennedy Boulevard, and Secaucus Road. 
Schuetzen Park/Columbia Park  at Kennedy Boulevard where Hackensack Plank Road becomes the Bergen Turnpike

See also
Other historical unincorporated communities, localities and place names located partially or completely within the township include Tyler Park, Homestead, Three Pigeons, Maisland, Granton, Hudson Heights, and Shadyside.

References

Sources
 

North Bergen, New Jersey
Neighborhoods in Hudson County, New Jersey